Charles Alan Philips (born October 15, 1952) is an American writer and journalist. He is best known for his  investigative reporting in the Los Angeles Times on the culture, corruption, and crime in the music industry during the 1990s and 2000s, which garnered both awards and controversy. In 1999, Philips won a Pulitzer Prize, with  Michael A. Hiltzik, for their co-authored series exposing corruption in the entertainment industry.

Philips reported extensively in the LA Times on the East Coast–West Coast hip hop rivalry and the murders of Tupac Shakur and  Christopher Wallace aka the Notorious B.I.G. and their respective investigations. In 2002, Philips described  Las Vegas' floundered probe into  Tupac's murder and put forth his own theory based on a yearlong investigation. His controversial theory,  which alleges the involvement of the late Wallace, has been neither confirmed nor verifiably debunked and continues to be debated.

In a 2008 article, Philips tied industry executives  Sean "Puffy" Combs and James Rosemond to the  1994 ambush of Shakur. In response, both Combs and Rosemond issued scathing statements of denial and received out-of-court settlements from the paper. Documents sourced by Philips to support his claims were later proven to be fabricated. Philips stood by his story despite the falsified documents. The Times ran a retraction along with apologies from Philips and his editors, and parted ways with Philips a few months later.

Philips' reporting is widely cited in media, including trade publications, journals, books, and podcasts. Critics allege an obsession with unsolved crimes in the Hip-hop community, interference with official investigations, and biased coverage of the Los Angeles Police Department and Death Row Records.

Early life and education
Philips grew up in the Detroit area and attended  Franklin High School. He moved to Los Angeles at age 19 and worked for the Wasserman Silk Screen Company of Santa Monica, California, while studying at California State University, Long Beach, where he received a B.A. in journalism in 1989.

Career
Philips spent a majority of his career writing for the LA Times, beginning as a  freelance writer in 1990 and joining the staff in 1995. He remained at the Times until being laid off in 2008. He wrote several investigative pieces and series about the music industry, particularly on controversial business practices, corruption, and crime. Philips has also written for  The Washington Post,  The San Francisco Chronicle, Rolling Stone, Spin, The Village Voice,  AllHipHop and The Source.

Investigating the business of entertainment
In 1991, Philips wrote an article exposing rampant sexual harassment in the music industry. He revealed, "Industry sources say sexual comportment has been a behind-the-scenes factor in certain recent executive shake-ups." The article details four cases of harassment at a prominent entertainment law firm and three record labels, Geffen Records, RCA Records, and Island Records. Philips continued relentless coverage and other media outlets followed suit. A follow up interview in which a victim graphicly describes her experience led to more women sharing their stories. By 1995, all six major record labels had updated their sexual harassment policies.

Gangsta rap battle of 1992

In the summer of 1992, Philips provided a platform to the artist who had just released one of the most controversial songs of all time, "Cop Killer." Ice-T was under fire from police, politicians, and even the President,  who called the song "sick." In his first interview after the controversy broke, the artist defended his role in a culture war. On the front page of the country's second-largest newspaper, in a Q&A about rock, race, and the 'Cop Killer' furor, Ice-T counterattacked his critics, "Arnold Schwarzenegger blew away dozens of cops as the Terminator. But I don’t hear anybody complaining."

Despite the song being a product of Ice-T's heavy metal band,  Body Count, it was ensnared in a campaign to ban gangsta rap. He complained:

"The one thing I wish is that the media would quit calling this a rap record. You’d think if they were going to do stories on ‘Cop Killer’ that they might at least listen to the song. But they obviously haven’t, because anyone who has knows it’s a rock record. I hate to get on the racial thing because that’s something I’ve always been totally against. But the problem with the media is that they think that the word rock means white and the word rap means black."

And politicians "want to shut rappers down. They want to silence us. The Supreme Court says it’s OK for a white man to burn a cross in public. But nobody wants a black man to write a record about a cop killer."

Ice-T had been accused by The Establishment of inciting violence against police officers. He illuminated Philips and his readers on the message of the song. It's not anti-police. It's anti-police brutality:
"No way all I’m doing on this record is playing a character I invented who’s fed up with police abuse. He’s not the average person who just figured out after the Rodney King incident that police brutality exists. This particular character has seen it too long and he loses it and goes on a rampage. What I’m trying to tell people is that police brutality in the ‘hood is nothing new. And the thing is that whether this guy, the cop killer in my song, is real or not, believe it, there are people at that point. OK? But anybody who says that my record is going to make them go over that point, that’s bulls---. No record can take a man to that point.
"Don’t these politicians realize the country was founded on the kind of revolutionary political thought expressed in my song? I mean, haven’t they ever listened to the national anthem? Anybody knows that the ‘Star-Spangled Banner’ is really just a song about a shoot-out between us and the police. Have they forgotten that Paul Revere became a Revolutionary War hero for warning everybody, ‘The police are coming, the police are coming?'"

Anti-censorship advocate Jeff Ayeroff, Rock the Vote co-founder and then Virgin Records executive, called attention to the hypocrisy, "It’s not like the White House expresses any interest in trying to resolve the polarization that this song reflects. They just want to exploit the fear of this potent black artist to their own political advantage."

Philips himself surmised: 
"When it’s all over, the 'Rap Battle of 1992' probably won’t rank up there in American history with the Revolutionary War or the War of 1812. But it has reopened the old American wounds of race and class. And the debate—which had been couched as a conflict between free expression and moral responsibility—has degenerated into an uncivil war of words enveloping politicians, business people, artists and others."

Thirty years later, this Ice-T Q&A and accompanying story, "The Uncivil War : The battle between the Establishment and supporters of rap music reopens old wounds of race and class," are part of American history. It is cited in numerous works related to Hip-hop culture, Black history, and free speech and first amendment rights.

Murder of Tupac Shakur theory

On September 7, 1996,  Shakur was shot in a drive-by shooting in Las Vegas. He died six days later due to the wounds inflicted. In 2002, following a yearlong investigation into the murder by the LA Times, Philips concluded that Shakur was killed by purported suspect Orlando Anderson, a member of the  Southside Compton Crips gang. Philips made an additional claim: "The murder weapon was supplied by New York rapper Notorious B.I.G., who agreed to pay the Crips $1 million for killing Shakur." In the days following the story, friends and family members denied any involvement by the late Wallace. The Wallace family issued a statement expressing outrage and called the article "irresponsible journalism." Friends provided alibis claiming Wallace was not in Las Vegas on the night of the shooting.

In an online chat in 2008, Philips told the participants that unidentified sources placed Wallace in Nevada on the night of Shakur's murder. He added:

"It has never been proven that Christopher Wallace was not in Las Vegas on the night Tupac was shot.  Bad Boy produced some computer-generated documents purporting to place him in a recording studio in New York, but they were not time-stamped. Bad Boy said it was going to produce video of Biggie there. They never did that. I have since learned that federal officials conducted interviews in Las Vegas to determine whether Wallace was present. My sources were there and say he and other East Coast figures were in Las Vegas on the night the Southside Crips killed Tupac." 

Louis Alfred, the recording engineer named in the session reports provided by Bad Boy, recalled a late-night recording session, but thought it unlikely it was the same night Shakur was shot. "We would have heard about it," he said.

No one has been arrested or prosecuted for the murder of Shakur and the case remains open. More than two decades following its publication, Philips' is among the theories still presented by the media.

Pivotal article on 1994 ambush of Shakur

While investigating Shakur's murder, Philips learned more about the 1994 ambush of Shakur in New York City. On March 17, 2008, he reported in the LA Times that the attack had been orchestrated by then talent manager and dealmaker James Rosemond a.k.a. Jimmy Henchman.  Twelve years before Philips implicated Rosemond, lyrics to Shakur's song " Against All Odds" hinted at a connection: "Promised a payback, Jimmy Henchmen, in due time, I knew you bitch niggas was listening, the world is mine, set me up, wet me up, niggas stuck me up."

Philips' story also claimed that Combs and Wallace had advance knowledge of the attack. To support his theory, Philips relied on unidentified sources and FBI transcripts of an interview with a confidential informant. Both Rosemond and Combs responded swiftly with statements denying Philips' claims.

Rosemond called the story a "libelous piece of garbage," adding, "In the past 14 years, I have not even been questioned by law enforcement with regard to the assault of Tupac Shakur, let alone brought up on charges. Chuck Philips, the writer … has reached a new low by employing fourth-hand information from desperate jailhouse informants along with ancient FBI reports to create this fabrication. I simply ask for all rap fans and fans of Tupac to analyze this fiction for what it is."

Combs said, “It is beyond ridiculous and completely false. Neither (the late rapper Notorious B.I.G.) nor I had any knowledge of any attack before, during or after it happened. I am shocked that the Los Angeles Times would be so irresponsible as to publish such a baseless and completely untrue story.”

On March 25, 2008, The Smoking Gun exposed the FBI documents sourced by Philips as fabrications. The extended bombshell piece began: 

"The Times appears to have been hoaxed by an imprisoned con man and accomplished document forger, an audacious swindler who has created a fantasy world in which he managed hip-hop luminaries, conducted business with Combs, Shakur, Busta Rhymes, and The Notorious B.I.G., and even served as Combs's trusted emissary to Death Row Records boss Marion "Suge" Knight during the outset of hostilities in the bloody East Coast-West Coast rap feud.  The con man, James Sabatino, 31, has long sought to insinuate himself, after the fact, in a series of important hip-hop events, from Shakur's shooting to the murder of The Notorious B.I.G.. In fact, however, Sabatino was little more than a rap devotee, a wildly impulsive, overweight white kid from Florida whose own father once described him in a letter to a federal judge as "a disturbed young man who needed attention like a drug."

On March 26, 2008, the LA Times announced an internal investigation and published an apology from Philips that read, "In relying on documents that I now believe were fake, I failed to do my job. I’m sorry." Philips was chastised by his peers and the paper was criticized for its "useless policies for controlling its overuse of unnamed sources." Philips' editors also issued statements:

Deputy Managing Editor Mark Duvoisin stated, "We should not have let ourselves be fooled. That we were is as much my fault as Chuck's. I deeply regret that we let our readers down."

Editor Russ Stanton claimed to take the criticism seriously, adding "We published this story with the sincere belief that the documents were genuine, but our good intentions are beside the point," Stanton said in a statement. "The bottom line is that the documents we relied on should not have been used. We apologize both to our readers and to those referenced in the documents and, as a result, in the story. We are continuing to investigate this matter and will fulfill our journalistic responsibility for critical self-examination."

On April 7, 2008, the LA Times issued a lengthy front-page retraction. The paper's investigation concluded that "the FBI reports were fabricated and that some of the other sources relied on — including the person Philips previously believed to be the ‘confidential source’ cited in the FBI reports — do not support major elements of the story."

This would be the last article Philips would write for the LA Times. On July 15, 2008, it was reported that he was let go in a round of layoffs. Philips later called foul on the career-ending retraction:
"In April 2008, the LA Times published a searing front-page retraction trashing my story, my sources, my reporting and myself. I was pressured for days to accept the way the paper wanted to phrase the retraction. But it was not accurate. My sources were solid. My reporting was solid. Unfortunately, the documents turned out to be fakes — and the guy who fabricated them a liar. The retraction made me sound like Jayson Blair or Janet Cooke. It was worded as though I had made up the entire story and snuck it into print behind management's back, without the knowledge, consent or guidance of senior editors and lawyers directly involved in its publication."
Philips later claimed, "[Rosemond] twisted smokingun.com’s indictment of the fake 302s into an exoneration of his role in the Quad ambush. Then he and his attorney, Jeffrey Lichtman, distorted smokinggun’s conclusions into a vile smear campaign against me online, attacking my credibility, demanding I be fired. They got their wish. Jimmy and Jeffrey fleeced the newspaper for a quarter million bucks, snookered them into printing a false retraction, plus walked away with my head on a platter."

Subsequent witness statements
In the intervening years, there have been several developments with the individuals, named and unnamed in Philips' article, and others involved in the incident.
 Dexter Isaac – In June 2011, the prison inmate confessed to being a perpetrator in Shakur's attack and claimed to have been paid $2,500 by Rosemond to rob Shakur.
 Philips confirmed Isaac as a source for his 2008 article and demanded an apology and a retraction of the retraction from the LA Times.
 The LA Times reiterated their reason for the retraction and declined Philips' request stating, "No new information has emerged that bears on the mistakes for which we apologized and which we retracted."
 Rosemond claims Isaac is a confidential informant who cannot be trusted.
 Rosemond's lawyer dismissed the claim: "It's a flat-out lie. Dexter Isaac is not claiming this 17 years later to clear his conscience. He's doing it because he's told anybody who will listen he doesn't want to die in prison. He has kids and wants to work off his sentence. He can't be trusted."
 James Rosemond – Incarcerated as of 2010, he is serving multiple life sentences for operating a Continuing Criminal Enterprise and the murder-for-hire of G-Unit artist Lowell "Lodi Mack" Fletcher. 
 During opening remarks at Rosemond's 2011 trial, the prosecutor said Rosemond had implicated himself in the shooting of Shakur at Quad.
 Rosemond's attorney Gerald Shargel "categorically and emphatically" denied the claim. Referencing the 2008 LA Times article, Shargel implied Philips had engaged in a smear campaign. He added, "[The prosecutor's] statement was positively and absolutely false whether intentional, or not intentional. I think not intentional. She was not the prosecutor who sat in on any of the proffer sessions with Mr. Rosemond."
 The prosecutor continued, "If Mr. Shargel is going to argue that this was a fabricated article, it's the government's position that we can put in the defendant's own admission about that particular shooting. In saying it is not true, when in fact it is true, the government should be able to rebut that argument that he's making, [and introduce] that the defendant actually admitted to this 1994 shooting."
 James Sabatino – The document forger is still pulling cons from prison.
 Zayd Malik – A friend of Shakur who accompanied him that night categorically rejects Isaac's confession in a rare interview in 2018. He also denies a setup by Rosemond, but alludes to NYPD involvement.
Following the Isaac and Rosemond court revelations, Philips penned an exclusive to the Village Voice in which he claimed, "Rap’s longest running crime mystery has finally been solved — and pretty much the way my March 2008 LA Times article reported it." MediaBistro's Fishbowl LA, which covered news related to the Los Angeles media, called Philips' Voice piece a "must-read essay that paints a very sorry picture of how the LAT dealt in a moment of crisis with an employee who faithfully served them for 18 years."

Alleged interference with official investigations

Wallace family civil suit
On April 9, 2002, the Wallace family filed a lawsuit against Los Angeles and LAPD chiefs claiming they "willfully and recklessly prevented a full and thorough investigation" in the murder of Christopher Wallace aka Notorious B.I.G. During an investigation in the late 1990s, Waymond Anderson testified that disgraced LAPD gang officer David Mack was involved in the 1997 killing of Wallace. In 2002, when deposed in the Wallace family civil suit brought against the City of Los Angeles, Anderson recanted his previous testimony. In 2008, while testifying in his own appeal of a 1993 arson murder conviction, Anderson reversed his recantation claiming he had lied at the deposition because he had received threats passed to him through Philips. Philips was covering Anderson's appeal, exploring his innocence. Kevin Mackie, another witness deposed in the Wallace civil case, confirmed Mack's attendance at Death Row events and added, "Chuck Philips was frequently at Death Row functions and received payments from Death Row Records." The Wallace family attorney claimed Anderson's changed testimony was influenced by Philips. Philips and the LA Times described the claim as "idiotic" and "utterly groundless."

FBI investigation into LAPD cover-up
In 2002, the FBI opened an investigation into the LAPD and potential civil rights violations in connection with Christopher Wallace aka Notorious B.I.G. In 2005, Philips revealed the identity of a confidential informant in the LA Times, referencing his moniker "Psycho Mike." Michael Robinson is described as a "reliable gang informant who had testified in federal court against the Bounty Hunter Bloods and worked as an informant for the Los Angeles County Sheriff Department's Major Crimes Bureau for more than 15 years."

LASD Sgt. Richard Valdemar criticized the LA Times in a 2010 Police Magazine article for exposing and endangering confidential informants. He believes Robinson was outed in response to his testimony implicating Death Row boss Suge Knight, LAPD gang officers Mack and Rafael Perez, and Amir Muhammad in Wallace's murder. Following the revelation, Robinson was attacked repeatedly and his family was targeted. Valdemar accuses Philips of protecting Death Row associates and links him to Robinson's death, "Michael Robinson died of a heart attack on Dec. 5, 2006. He was only 49 years old. It is my belief that Michael Robinson died as a result of the stress and anxiety caused by his exposure and identification in Chuck Philip's hit piece that ran June 3, 2005."

FBI special agent Philip J. Carson, the lead investigator on the case, confirms Philips' relentless pursuit for information and interference with the investigation. Prior to the article's publication, Philips had demanded an interview with Carson. Since Carson could not comment on the active case, he connected Philips to the FBI press office. Carson recalls the follow up from FBI PR rep Cathy Viray, "Well, the good news is we met with Chuck Philips. The bad news is, he doesn't care what we have to say. He's going to ruin you in an upcoming article and it's going to ruin this case and it's going to ruin your career." Recorded phone conversations confirm the threats.

Carson contends that he solely briefed LAPD Chief Mike Berkow and that Berkow fed information undermining the case to Philips. Carson identifies Philips' reporting in the LA Times as one of the "powerful forces" used by the LAPD to derail the FBI's investigation.

LA Times cast as tool in LAPD cover-up

In 1997, Philips interviewed Shakur's former bodyguard Frank Alexander as an eyewitness to Shakur's 1996 deadly shooting. In their book, Chaos Merchants: Murders of Tupac Shakur and Notorious BIG, former LAPD officer Russell Poole and documentarian Michael Douglas Carlin write that Alexander secretly recorded phone conversations with Philips as well as Death Row insiders. They claim the recordings "offer insight into interworking of Death Row Records and their ties to Philips in creating false stories to run in the LA Times."

While revisiting the FBI's investigation with Carson in The Dossier : The LAPD Cover-up of the Murder of Biggie Smalls podcast, investigative filmmaker Don Sikorski says he "uncovered sourced proof that Philips was in bed with one of the top brass at LAPD, Mike Berkow. Berkow was feeding him information to print in the paper. To go further, Philips wrote in upwards of five stories that created false narrative surrounding the investigation into Biggie's murder."

Wallace family attorney Perry Sanders designates the LA Times "co-conspirators in the cover-up."

Chuck Philips Post
On September 13, 2012, the anniversary of Shakur's death, Philips announced he would do a "Twitter experiment," tweeting a 1,200-word article, 40 characters at a time, concurrently with the launch of his website, the Chuckphilipspost.com. The article was about Harlem drug dealer Eric “Von Zip” Martin and his alleged connection to Sean "Diddy" Combs. The latest post on his website, about the death of Alesia Thomas while in LAPD custody, was published on October 15, 2012.

Cultural Influence
In their 2001 book Controversies of the Music Industry, Richard D. Barnet and Larry L. Burriss credit Philips' continued reporting on sexual harassment in the music industry for prompting coverage by other media outlets and bringing the conversation to a national forum. "The article generated heated debate in the music industry and motivated several record companies to review their policies regarding sex bias and harassment."

Along with outspoken hip-hop critic Bill O'Reilly, Philips is dissed in a verse by Jay-Z on  Missy Elliott's 2003 song ″Back in the Day.″

Retired FBI Agent Philip J. Carson asserts that when Philips identified a confidential informant by name in his June 3, 2005, article ″Informant in Rap Star's Slaying Admits Hearsay,″ he endangered the informant's life and derailed the FBI's investigation into LAPD's involvement in the murder of Notorious B.I.G. "Two or three weeks later, [the informant's] house got shot up by  AK-47s and his daughter and granddaughter were at the house. The granddaughter got hit. The FBI, we had to relocate 'Psycho Mike' and his family to another city."

In September 2011,  Showtime announced the production of a documentary film to be directed by Antoine Fuqua about Death Row Records co-founder Marion "Suge" Knight. Philips was named as a co-producer. American Dream/American Knightmare was released in 2018 though Philips is not listed in the  television film's credits.

Philips is the primary subject featured in "Episode 7: The LA Times and the Murder of Biggie" of The Dossier : The LAPD Cover-Up of the Murder of Biggie (2020) podcast series.

Philips is the primary subject featured in the "BONUS: Chuck Philips & Misinformation" episode of the Unjust Justice: The Jimmy Rosemond Story (2022) podcast series.

Awards
1990: Los Angeles Press Club award for stories about censorship.
1996:  Long Island University's George Polk Award in the Culture Reporting category for "revealing the inner workings of America's $12 billion music industry." 
1997: National Association of Black Journalists Award for coverage of the rap music business.
1999: Pulitzer Prize for Beat Reporting with  Michael A. Hiltzik for a year-long series in the Los Angeles Times that exposed corruption in the music business.

Cited in

Notes

References

Select bibliography

Interviews
Randy Newman – 
Miles Davis – 
Ice-T – 
Tupac Shakur – 
Snoop Dogg –

Censorship

The business of music

Pearl Jam vs. Ticketmaster

Pulitzer Prize-winning series on corruption in the music industry

Crime in hip-hop coverage and controversy

External links 

The Chuck Philips Post
Articles by Chuck Philips – Los Angeles Times

Living people
1952 births
Pulitzer Prize for Beat Reporting winners
George Polk Award recipients
American male journalists
American music journalists
American writers about music
American crime reporters
American writers of Armenian descent
Writers from Detroit
American investigative journalists
American newspaper reporters and correspondents
Tupac Shakur
Los Angeles Times people
Writers from Los Angeles